Steele Narrows Provincial Park is an historical provincial park in the west-central region of the Canadian province of Saskatchewan in the transition zone between parkland and boreal forest. It is located on Makwa Lake at Steele Narrows – the channel that separates Sanderson Bay from Makwa Lake – about 10 kilometres west of the village of Loon Lake along Highway 699. The park is the site of the Battle of Loon Lake, which was not only the last battle of the North-West Rebellion, but also the last battle fought on Canadian soil. The battle occurred on 3 June 1885.

On 31 May 1950, the site was designated a National Historic Site of Canada and on 26 May 1986, the provincial park was established.

The  park has plaques and information related to the battle, including white concrete markers which denote the locations of significant events during the battle. The park's landscape features rolling hills, forests, and muskeg and remains virtually unchanged from the time of the battle. Along with the historical monument, there's also a picnic area, fish cleaning station, and boat launch. Fish commonly found in Makwa Lake include northern pike, walleye, and yellow perch.

See also 
History of Saskatchewan
List of protected areas of Saskatchewan
Makwa Lake Provincial Park
Tourism in Saskatchewan

References

External links 
Military map of Loon Lake
Makwa Lake

Provincial parks of Saskatchewan
Loon Lake No. 561, Saskatchewan
Canadian Register of Historic Places in Saskatchewan
National Historic Sites in Saskatchewan